SM U-89 was one of the 329 submarines serving in the Imperial German Navy in World War I. 
U-89 was engaged in the naval warfare and took part in the First Battle of the Atlantic. There were no survivors.

Design
German Type U 87 submarines were preceded by the shorter Type U 81 submarines. U-89 had a displacement of  when at the surface and  while submerged. The submarine was powered by two  engines for use while surfaced, and two  engines for use while submerged. She had two propeller shafts.

U-89 was fitted with four  torpedo tubes (two at the bow and two at the stern), ten to twelve torpedoes, one  SK L/45 deck gun, and one  SK L/30 deck gun. She had a complement of thirty-six (thirty-two crew members and four officers).

Summary of raiding history

References

Notes

Citations

Bibliography

World War I submarines of Germany
German Type U 87 submarines
Ships built in Danzig
1916 ships
U-boats commissioned in 1917
Maritime incidents in 1918
U-boats sunk in 1918
U-boats sunk by British warships
Ships lost with all hands
World War I shipwrecks in the Atlantic Ocean
U-boats sunk in collisions